Jorge San Esteban (born 28 June 1972 in La Plata) is a former Argentine football defender.

Club career

San Esteban began his professional playing career in 1992 with Club de Gimnasia y Esgrima La Plata, he made his league debut on 23 February 1992 in a 2-1 away defeat against Deportivo Español. He went on to make over 300 appearances for the club during his first spell. He joined Nueva Chicago for the 2003-04 season but returned to Gimnasia for a second spell between 2004 and 2009.

In the 2006-07 season, San Esteban was criticized by the press as Gimnasia went through a string of defeats to local teams (7-0 to Estudiantes de La Plata, 5-1 to Boca Juniors) and in international competition (three goals or more per match against Colo Colo, Defensor Sporting Club, and Santos).

In the 2009 winter transfer window he joined Villa San Carlos of Primera B Metropolitana.

International career
He played for the Argentina national football team in a friendly against Mexico in 1999.

References

External links

 Argentine Primera statistics
 Terra.com.ar Jorge San Esteban
 BDFA profile

1972 births
Living people
Argentine footballers
Argentine football managers
Argentine Primera División players
Nueva Chicago footballers
Club de Gimnasia y Esgrima La Plata footballers
Club Atlético Villa San Carlos footballers
Argentina international footballers
Association football defenders
Footballers from La Plata